Vest-Agder is one of the 19 multi-member constituencies of the Storting, the national legislature of Norway. The constituency was established in 1921 following the introduction of proportional representation for elections to the Storting. It consists of the municipalities of Åseral, Farsund, Flekkefjord, Hægebostad, Kristiansand, Kvinesdal, Lindesnes, Lyngdal, Sirdal and Vennesla in the county of Agder. The constituency currently elects five of the 169 members of the Storting using the open party-list proportional representation electoral system. At the 2021 parliamentary election it had 137,466 registered electors.

Electoral system
Vest-Agder currently elects five of the 169 members of the Storting using the open party-list proportional representation electoral system. Constituency seats are allocated by the County Electoral Committee using the Modified Sainte-Laguë method. Compensatory seats (seats at large) are calculated based on the national vote and are allocated by the National Electoral Committee using the Modified Sainte-Laguë method at the constituency level (one for each constituency). Only parties that reach the 4% national threshold compete for compensatory seats.

Election results

Summary

(Excludes compensatory seats. Figures in italics represent joint lists.)

Detailed

2020s

2021
Results of the 2021 parliamentary election held on 13 September 2021:

The following candidates were elected:
Anja Ninasdotter Abusland (Sp); Ingunn Foss (H); Kari Henriksen (Ap); Kjell Ingolf Ropstad (KrF); Gisle Meininger Saudland (FrP); and Ingvild Wetrhus Thorsvik.

2010s

2017
Results of the 2017 parliamentary election held on 11 September 2017:

The following candidates were elected:
Norunn Tveiten Benestad (H); Torhild Bransdal (KrF); Ingunn Foss (H); Hans Fredrik Grøvan (KrF); Kari Henriksen (Ap); and Gisle Meininger Saudland (FrP).

2013
Results of the 2013 parliamentary election held on 8 and 9 September 2013:

The following candidates were elected:
Norunn Tveiten Benestad (H); Ingunn Foss (H); Hans Fredrik Grøvan (KrF); Kari Henriksen (Ap); Åse Michaelsen (FrP); and Odd Omland (Ap).

2000s

2009
Results of the 2009 parliamentary election held on 13 and 14 September 2009:

The following candidates were elected:
Dagrun Eriksen (KrF); Peter Skovholt Gitmark (H); Kari Henriksen (Ap); Alf Egil Holmelid (SV); Åse Michaelsen (FrP); and Henning Skumsvoll (FrP).

2005
Results of the 2005 parliamentary election held on 11 and 12 September 2005:

The following candidates were elected:
Peter Skovholt Gitmark (H); Rolf Terje Klungland (Ap); Anne Margrethe Larsen (V); Jon Lilletun (KrF); Åse Michaelsen (FrP); and Henning Skumsvoll (FrP).

2001
Results of the 2001 parliamentary election held on 9 and 10 September 2001:

The following candidates were elected:
Anne Berit Andersen (H); Dagrun Eriksen (KrF); Ansgar Gabrielsen (H); Rolf Terje Klungland (Ap); and Jon Lilletun (KrF).

1990s

1997
Results of the 1997 parliamentary election held on 15 September 1997:

The following candidates were elected:
Aud Blattmann (Ap); Ansgar Gabrielsen (H); Vidar Kleppe (FrP); Jon Lilletun (KrF); and Anne Brit Stråtveit (KrF).

1993
Results of the 1993 parliamentary election held on 12 and 13 September 1993:

The following candidates were elected:
Aud Blattmann (Ap); Ansgar Gabrielsen (H); Rolf Terje Klungland (Ap); Jon Lilletun (KrF); and Sigurd Manneråk (Sp).

1980s

1989
Results of the 1989 parliamentary election held on 10 and 11 September 1989:

The following candidates were elected:
John G. Bernander (H); Aud Blattmann (Ap); Vidar Kleppe (FrP); Jon Lilletun (KrF); and Sigurd Verdal (Ap).

1985
Results of the 1985 parliamentary election held on 8 and 9 September 1985:

As the list alliance was not entitled to more seats contesting as an alliance than it was contesting as individual parties, the distribution of seats was as party votes.

The following candidates were elected:
Tore Austad (H); Aud Blattmann (Ap); Ole Frithjof Klemsdal (H); Harald Synnes (KrF); and Sigurd Verdal (Ap).

1981
Results of the 1981 parliamentary election held on 13 and 14 September 1981:

The following candidates were elected:
Tore Austad (H); Ole Frithjof Klemsdal (H); Engly Lie (Ap); Harald Synnes (KrF); and Sigurd Verdal (Ap).

1970s

1977
Results of the 1977 parliamentary election held on 11 and 12 September 1977:

The following candidates were elected:
Tore Austad (H); Engly Lie (Ap); Odd Lien (Ap); Ragnar Udjus (Sp); and Toralf Westermoen (KrF).

1973
Results of the 1973 parliamentary election held on 9 and 10 September 1973:

The following candidates were elected:
Engly Lie (Ap); Odd Lien (Ap); Kolbjørn Stordrange (H); Ragnar Udjus (Sp); and Toralf Westermoen (KrF).

1960s

1969
Results of the 1969 parliamentary election held on 7 and 8 September 1969:

The following candidates were elected:
Jens Haugland (Ap); Bent Røiseland (V); Salve Andreas Salvesen (Ap); Kolbjørn Stordrange (H); and Toralf Westermoen (KrF).

1965
Results of the 1965 parliamentary election held on 12 and 13 September 1965:

The following candidates were elected:
Jens Haugland (Ap); Bent Røiseland (V); Sverre Walter Rostoft (H); Salve Andreas Salvesen (Ap); and Haakon Sløgedal (KrF).

1961
Results of the 1961 parliamentary election held on 11 September 1961:

A re-run of the election was held in Flekkefjord, Greipstad, Oddernes and Søgne after an audit found 30 more ballot papers than were recorded as issued. Results of the election held on 22 January 1962:

The re-run did not lead to changes in the distribution of seats but the order the in which the candidates were elected did change.

The following candidates were elected:
Olai Ingemar Eikeland (V-Sp), 17,585 votes; Jens Haugland (Ap), 18,103 votes; Ole Jørgensen (Ap), 18,098 votes; Bent Røiseland (V-Sp), 17,598 votes; and Haakon Sløgedal (KrF), 8,257 votes.

1950s

1957
Results of the 1957 parliamentary election held on 7 October 1957:

The following candidates were elected:
Kaare Steel Groos (H); Trygve Haugeland (Bp); Jens Haugland (Ap); Ole Jørgensen (Ap); and Bent Røiseland (V).

1953
Results of the 1953 parliamentary election held on 12 October 1953:

The following candidates were elected:
Arne Askildsen (KrF); Jens Haugland (Ap); Ole Jørgensen (Ap); Bent Røiseland (V); and Sverre Walter Rostoft (H).

1940s

1949
Results of the 1949 parliamentary election held on 10 October 1949:

The following candidates were elected:
Aasmund Kulien (Ap); Syvert Tobiassen Messel (V); Gabriel Moseid (H-Bp); and Bent Røiseland (V).

1945
Results of the 1945 parliamentary election held on 8 October 1945:

The following candidates were elected:
Karl Johan Fjermeros (V); Aasmund Kulien (Ap); Gabriel Moseid (Bp); and Bent Røiseland (V).

1930s

1936
Results of the 1936 parliamentary election held on 19 October 1936:

As the list alliance was entitled to more seats contesting as an alliance than it was contesting as individual parties, the distribution of seats was as list alliance votes. The H-Bp list alliance's additional seat was allocated to the Conservative Party.

The following candidates were elected:
Nils Holbek (V); Aasmund Kulien (Ap); Gabriel Moseid (Bp); and Berner August Berntsen Skeibrok (H).

1933
Results of the 1933 parliamentary election held on 16 October 1933:

The following candidates were elected:
Gunnuf Eiesland (V); Gabriel Moseid (Bp); Berner August Berntsen Skeibrok (H); and Alfred Udland (Ap).

1930
Results of the 1930 parliamentary election held on 20 October 1930:

The following candidates were elected:
Nils Salveson Belland (V); Gunnuf Eiesland (V); Gabriel Moseid (Bp); and Berner August Berntsen Skeibrok (H).

1920s

1927
Results of the 1927 parliamentary election held on 17 October 1927:

The following candidates were elected:
Nils Salveson Belland (V); Gunnuf Eiesland (V); Gabriel Moseid (Bp); and Alfred Udland (Ap).

1924
Results of the 1924 parliamentary election held on 21 October 1924:

The following candidates were elected:
Nils Salveson Belland (V); Gunnuf Eiesland (V); Gabriel Moseid (Bp); and Karl Sanne (H-FV).

1921
Results of the 1921 parliamentary election held on 24 October 1921:

The following candidates were elected:
Nils Salveson Belland (V); Gunnuf Eiesland (V); Gabriel Moseid (L); and Karl Sanne (H).

Notes

References

Storting constituencies
Storting constituencies established in 1921
Storting constituency